Sory Kaba (born 10 April 1995) is a Guinean professional footballer who plays as a forward for Cardiff City, on loan from Midtjylland, and the Guinea national team.

Club career
Born in Conakry, Kaba moved to Spain at early age and joined Alcobendas CF's youth setup in September 2012. He made his senior debut during the 2013–14 season, helping in their promotion to Tercera División.

On 29 January 2016, Kaba joined Elche CF, being assigned to the reserves also in the fourth tier. On 13 May of the following year he made his first team debut, coming on as a second-half substitute for Álex Fernández in a 1–0 Segunda División home loss against CD Mirandés.

Kaba scored his first professional goal on 28 May 2017, netting the equalizer in a 1–1 home draw against CF Reus Deportiu. On 29 July, after suffering relegation, he extended his contract for three years and was definitely promoted to the first team.

On 31 January 2019, the last day of the 2018–19 winter transfer window, Kaba signed with Ligue 1 side Dijon FCO having agreed a -year contract. The club paid a €4 million transfer fee to Elche triggering a release clause.

On 5 July 2019, Danish Superliga club FC Midtjylland announced that they had signed Kaba on a five-year contract. On 31 August 2021, Kaba moved to Belgian First Division A club OH Leuven on loan for the 2021–22 season. OH Leuven secured an option to sign him permanently. On 1 June it was confirmed that Kaba was returning to Midtjylland, as the Belgian club had decided not to exercise the option to buy the striker.

On 31 January 2023, the last day of the 2022–23 transfer window, Kaba joined EFL Championship club Cardiff City on loan until the end of the season.

International career
Kaba was first called up for the Guinea national team on 25 September 2017, for a 2018 FIFA World Cup qualifiers against Tunisia. He made his full international debut on 7 October, replacing Demba Camara in the 4–1 loss.

Career statistics

International

Scores and results list Guinea's goal tally first, score column indicates score after each Kaba goal.

Honours
FC Midtjylland
Danish Superliga: 2019–20

References

External links

1995 births
Living people
Sportspeople from Conakry
Guinean footballers
Association football forwards
Guinea international footballers
2019 Africa Cup of Nations players
2021 Africa Cup of Nations players
Segunda División players
Segunda División B players
Tercera División players
Ligue 1 players
Danish Superliga players
Elche CF Ilicitano footballers
Elche CF players
Dijon FCO players
FC Midtjylland players
Oud-Heverlee Leuven players
Cardiff City F.C. players
Guinean expatriate footballers
Guinean expatriate sportspeople in Spain
Expatriate footballers in Spain
Guinean expatriate sportspeople in France
Expatriate footballers in France
Guinean expatriate sportspeople in Denmark
Expatriate men's footballers in Denmark
Guinean expatriate sportspeople in Belgium
Expatriate footballers in Belgium
Guinean expatriate sportspeople in Wales
Expatriate footballers in Wales